Gailard Sartain (born September 18, 1946) is an American retired actor, often playing characters with roots in the South.  He was a regular on the country music variety series Hee Haw. He is also known for his roles in three of the Ernest movies and the TV series Hey Vern, It's Ernest!, which ran for one season on CBS in 1988. He is also an accomplished and successful painter and illustrator.

Early years and education
Sartain was born in Tulsa, Oklahoma, the son of a Tulsa fire chief. He attended Cascia Hall Preparatory School, is a 1963 graduate of Will Rogers High School in Tulsa and was a member of the Epsilon Mu chapter of the Kappa Sigma Fraternity at the University of Tulsa, from which he graduated with a Bachelor of Fine Arts degree.  In 1968, Gailard moved to New York City, where he worked as an assistant to illustrator Paul Davis.

Career
Sartain's entry into entertainment was launched in Tulsa. Working originally as a cameraman at a local television station, he gained notoriety through the creation of a late night off-the-wall comedy program entitled The Uncanny Film Festival and Camp Meeting.  Dressed as a wizard, wearing a dark blue robe and pointed wizard's cap, Sartain hosted the program as "Dr. Mazeppa Pompazoidi".  Other cast members included fellow Tulsa native Gary Busey and Jim Millaway. The program was broadcast on the Tulsa CBS affiliate KOTV and later the ABC affiliate KTUL. It featured B-movies, with skits written and performed by Sartain, Busey and company between the movie segments.

Discovered by a talent scout during his stint as Mazeppa, Sartain was hired in 1972 as a regular on the television program Hee Haw. Sartain remained as a regular cast member of the popular show for nearly 20 seasons. He also served as a regular on other series including Cher (1975–76) and Shields and Yarnell (1978). Sartain played C.D. Parker for one episode during the pilot season of Walker, Texas Ranger. He supplied the voice of a social worker in the pilot episode of the animated series King of the Hill.  Sartain also portrayed an advisor to Louisiana Governor Earl Long (played by Paul Newman) in the movie Blaze.

Sartain has appeared in more than forty motion pictures, most notably as The Big Bopper in The Buddy Holly Story, Sheriff Ray Stuckey in Mississippi Burning, The Outsiders, The Hollywood Knights, Fried Green Tomatoes, The Replacements as Offensive Assistant Coach Leo Pilachowski, The Big Easy, The Grifters, Getting Even with Dad, The Patriot, and an uncredited role in the 1994 comedy Wagons East starring John Candy and Richard Lewis. Sartain also appeared in a deleted scene from the Steve Martin comedy The Jerk as a Texas oil millionaire who successfully begs for $1500 (in cash) to replace the cracked leather seats on his private airplane: "You know what this means? I can fly my friends to the Super Bowl like a man, not like some kinda god-danged bum!"

Sartain also appeared in Mel McDaniel's music video for "Stand Up" in 1985.

His final film role was in 2005, in Cameron Crowe's Elizabethtown. He is also known for his roles in three of the Ernest P. Worrell films starring Jim Varney (as well as the Hey Vern, It's Ernest! television series). With fellow Hey Vern co-star Bill Byrge of Nashville, the duo performed as brothers Chuck and Bobby in a series of "Me and my brother, Bobby..." pitches for local TV stations and product ads.

He was replaced by a younger brother named Tom Tulip (Dallas native John Cadenhead) in Ernest Scared Stupid.

A successful illustrator, Sartain's artistic credits range from record cover designs for such artists as Leon Russell (Will O' the Wisp) to illustrations for nationally published magazines.

Filmography

Film

Nashville (1975) .... Man at Lunch Counter (uncredited)
The Buddy Holly Story (1978) .... Big Bopper
Smokey and the Good Time Outlaws (1978) .... Arthur Leddy
The Jerk (1979) .... Guy with Cracked Airplane Seats (uncredited)
The Hollywood Knights (1980) .... Bimbeau
Roadie (1980) .... B.B. Muldoon
Hard Country (1981) .... Johnny Bob
Endangered Species (1982) .... Mayor
The Outsiders (1983) .... Jerry
Choose Me (1984) .... Mueller
All of Me (1984) .... Fulton Norris
Songwriter (1984) .... Mulreaux
Trouble in Mind (1985) .... Fat Adolph
Uphill All the Way (1986) .... Private
The Big Easy (1986) .... Chef Paul
Ernest Goes to Camp (1987) .... Jake (Chef #1)
Leader of the Band (1987) .... Elmo De Lavallard
Made in Heaven (1987) .... Sam Morrell
The Moderns (1988) .... New York Critic
Ernest Saves Christmas (1988) .... Chuck
Mississippi Burning (1988) .... Sheriff Ray Stuckey
Blaze (1989) .... LaGrange
Love at Large (1990) .... Taxi Driver
Ernest Goes to Jail (1991) .... Chuck
The Grifters (1990) .... Joe
The Chase (1991, TV Movie) - Hammer
Guilty by Suspicion (1991) .... Chairman Wood
Fried Green Tomatoes (1991) .... Ed Couch
Death Falls (1991) .... Hearse Driver
Stop! Or My Mom Will Shoot (1992) .... Munroe
Equinox (1992) .... Dandridge
Wishman (1992) .... Dr. Abe Rogers
Walker, Texas Ranger (1993, TV Series) .... C.D. Parker
The Real McCoy (1993) .... Gary Buckner
Sandman (1993) .... Dave
Clean Slate (1994) .... Judge Block
Getting Even with Dad (1994) .... Carl
Wagons East (1994) .... J.P. Moreland (uncredited)
Speechless (1994) .... Lee Cutler
Open Season (1995) .... George Plunkett
The Spitfire Grill (1996) .... Sheriff Gary Walsh
Murder in Mind (1997) .... Charlie
RocketMan (1997) .... Mr. Randall (uncredited)
Joe Torre: Curveballs Along the Way (1997, TV Movie) .... Don Zimmer
The Patriot (1998) .... Floyd Chisolm
Existo (1999) .... Colette Watchuwill
The All New Adventures of Laurel & Hardy in For Love or Mummy (1999) .... Oliver Fattius Hardy
Pirates of Silicon Valley (1999, TV Movie) .... Ed Roberts
The Replacements (2000) .... Pilachowski
Ali (2001) .... Gordon Davidson
The Round and Round (2002) .... Jim Stoops
Elizabethtown (2005) .... Charles Dean

References

External links 

Official Website
Mazeppa article by Lindsey Neal Kuykendall in This Land Press January 2011

1946 births
American male film actors
American illustrators
Living people
Male actors from Tulsa, Oklahoma
University of Tulsa alumni
Horror hosts
20th-century American male actors
21st-century American male actors